Abdul Kadir Mappong was the first Deputy Chief Justice of the Supreme Court Indonesia for judicial affairs. Mappong had initially been appointed as a member of the Supreme Court of Indonesia in the year 2000 before his eventual retirement from the judiciary in the year 2013.

References

Living people
Year of birth missing (living people)
Justices of the Supreme Court of Indonesia
21st-century Indonesian judges